Rhodoleptus is a genus of beetles in the family Cerambycidae, containing the following species:

 Rhodoleptus comis (Bates, 1892)
 Rhodoleptus femoratus (Schaeffer, 1909)
 Rhodoleptus nigripennis Giesbert, 1993
 Rhodoleptus umbrosus Chemsak & Linsley, 1982

References

Trachyderini
Cerambycidae genera